Kill The Messenger is a 2006 French documentary film about Sibel Edmonds. An English version was produced in 2007 by SBS Australia.

The documentary focuses on both Ms. Edmonds's personal struggle to expose the criminality that she uncovered while at the FBI, and also the Sept. 11, 2001 tied 'secret' itself - the network of nuclear black-market, narcotics and illegal arms trafficking activities. Interviewees include David Rose, Philip Giraldi, Daniel Ellsberg, Coleen Rowley and Russell Tice.

U.S. premiere
On September 9, 2009, the film had its U.S. premiere at the 9/11 Film Festival at the Grand Lake Theater in Oakland, California.

See also
Axis of Evil
Baghdad or Bust
Control Room
My Country, My Country
War Feels Like War

Footnotes

External links
 

2006 television films
2006 films
2006 documentary films
French documentary films
2000s French-language films
Documentary films about the September 11 attacks
Films set in 2001
2000s English-language films
2000s French films
2006 multilingual films
French multilingual films